Drake Thadzi (born November 23, 1964 in Lilongwe) is a Malawian former professional boxer who competed from 1984 to 1998, twice challenging for a light heavyweight world title in 1995 and 1998. As am amateur, he competed at the 1984 Summer Olympics in Los Angeles.

Amateur career
Thadzi represented Malawi at the 1984 Olympics; he was decisioned in the second round of competition in the light heavyweight division (– 81 kg) by Algeria's eventual bronze medalist Mustapha Moussa.

Professional career
Soon afterwards Thadzi turned professional. He challenged Virgil Hill for the WBA light heavyweight title in 1995 but lost a decision.

Thadzi scored his career best win in 1997, when he upset three-time world champion James Toney via majority decision at the Foxwoods Casino. At that point Thadzi appeared primed to fight for a title but manager Goody Petronelli inexplicably failed to get him a fight during the next 15 months. Thadzi finished out with only two more fights after the Toney win – a technical knockout victory over "Iceman" John Scully and a title loss to Dariusz Michalczewski – before retiring in 1998 with a record of 30 wins (25 KO's), 1 draw and 9 losses.

Professional boxing record

|-
|align="center" colspan=8|30 Wins (25 KOs), 9 Losses (4 KOs), 1 Draw 
|-
| align="center" style="border-style: none none solid solid; background: #e3e3e3"|Result
| align="center" style="border-style: none none solid solid; background: #e3e3e3"|Record
| align="center" style="border-style: none none solid solid; background: #e3e3e3"|Opponent
| align="center" style="border-style: none none solid solid; background: #e3e3e3"|Type
| align="center" style="border-style: none none solid solid; background: #e3e3e3"|Round
| align="center" style="border-style: none none solid solid; background: #e3e3e3"|Date
| align="center" style="border-style: none none solid solid; background: #e3e3e3"|Location
| align="center" style="border-style: none none solid solid; background: #e3e3e3"|Notes

|-align=center
|Loss
|
|align=left| Dariusz Michalczewski
|TKO
|9
|12/12/1998
|align=left| Frankfurt, Germany
|

|-align=center
|Win
|
|align=left| Iceman John Scully
|TKO
|7
|02/08/1998
|align=left| Boston, Massachusetts, U.S.
|
|-align=center
|Win
|
|align=left| James Toney
|MD
|12
|14/05/1997
|align=left| Mashantucket, Connecticut, U.S.
|
|-
|Win
|
|align=left| Darrell Flint
|TKO
|9
|19/10/1996
|align=left| Halifax, Nova Scotia, Canada
|
|-align=center
|Loss
|
|align=left| Virgil Hill
|UD
|12
|02/09/1995
|align=left| Wembley, London, England
|
|-
|Win
|
|align=left| Jose Hiram Torres
|KO
|2
|19/05/1995
|align=left| New Bedford, Massachusetts, U.S.
|align=left|
|-
|Win
|
|align=left| Joe Harris
|KO
|2
|04/03/1995
|align=left| Boston, Massachusetts, U.S.
|align=left|
|-
|Win
|
|align=left| Willie Kemp
|PTS
|8
|01/10/1994
|align=left| Boston, Massachusetts, U.S.
|align=left|
|-
|Win
|
|align=left| Zoltan Fuzesy
|TKO
|3
|04/06/1994
|align=left| Dortmund, Germany
|align=left|
|-
|Loss
|
|align=left| Ernest Mateen
|MD
|10
|13/05/1993
|align=left| Atlantic City, New Jersey, U.S.
|align=left|
|-
|Loss
|
|align=left| Adolpho Washington
|UD
|10
|16/01/1993
|align=left| San Antonio, Texas, U.S.
|align=left|
|-
|Win
|
|align=left| Jose Vera
|PTS
|8
|08/05/1992
|align=left| Taunton, Massachusetts, U.S.
|align=left|
|-
|Loss
|
|align=left| Art Bayliss
|KO
|8
|28/02/1992
|align=left| Boston, Massachusetts, U.S.
|align=left|
|-
|Win
|
|align=left| Danny Chapman
|TKO
|3
|12/12/1991
|align=left| Taunton, Massachusetts, U.S.
|
|-align=center
|Win
|
|align=left| Jimmy Harrison
|TKO
|5
|23/08/1991
|align=left| Boston, Massachusetts, U.S.
|
|-align=center
|Win
|
|align=left| Danny Stonewalker
|TKO
|8
|04/08/1991
|align=left| Moncton, New Brunswick, Canada
|
|-
|Win
|
|align=left| Robert Curry
|TKO
|3
|31/05/1991
|align=left| Shediac, New Brunswick, Canada
|
|-
|Loss
|
|align=left| Leslie Stewart
|UD
|10
|28/02/1991
|align=left| Halifax, Nova Scotia, Canada
|align=left|
|-
|Win
|
|align=left| Melvin Ricks
|KO
|6
|14/09/1990
|align=left| Shediac, New Brunswick, Canada
|
|-align=center
|Win
|
|align=left| Wesley Reid
|KO
|3
|22/06/1990
|align=left| Taunton, Massachusetts, U.S.
|
|-align=center
|Win
|
|align=left| Ruben Cardona
|KO
|5
|23/02/1990
|align=left| Lowell, Massachusetts, U.S.
|
|-align=center
|Loss
|
|align=left| Wesley Reid
|KO
|4
|19/01/1990
|align=left| Taunton, Massachusetts, U.S.
|
|-align=center
|Win
|
|align=left| Keith Bristol
|UD
|6
|20/10/1989
|align=left| Taunton, Massachusetts, U.S.
|align=left|
|-
|Loss
|
|align=left| Al Cole
|PTS
|6
|12/09/1989
|align=left| Atlantic City, New Jersey, U.S.
|
|-
|Win
|
|align=left| Keith Bristol
|KO
|5
|09/06/1989
|align=left| Taunton, Massachusetts, U.S.
|
|-
|Win
|
|align=left| Rodney Jones
|TKO
|1
|28/04/1989
|align=left| Taunton, Massachusetts, U.S.
|align=left|
|-
|Win
|
|align=left| Terry Francis
|KO
|5
|30/03/1989
|align=left| Moncton, New Brunswick, Canada
|align=left|
|-
|Win
|
|align=left| Dennis Burley
|TKO
|2
|10/12/1988
|align=left| Salem, New Hampshire, U.S.
|align=left|
|-
|Win
|
|align=left| Angel Colon
|TKO
|1
|22/10/1988
|align=left| Salem, New Hampshire, U.S.
|
|-
|Win
|
|align=left| Andy Gordon
|TKO
|2
|30/07/1988
|align=left| Brockton, Massachusetts, U.S.
|align=left|
|-
|Loss
|
|align=left| Sadik Sulemana
|TKO
|4
|24/11/1987
|align=left| Halifax, Nova Scotia, Canada
|align=left|
|-
|Draw
|
|align=left| Darrell Flint
|PTS
|6
|29/09/1987
|align=left| Halifax, Nova Scotia, Canada
|align=left|
|-
|Win
|
|align=left| Ken Barlow
|TKO
|3
|20/09/1987
|align=left| Shediac, New Brunswick, Canada
|
|-
|Win
|
|align=left| Ken Barlow
|TKO
|2
|07/07/1987
|align=left| Halifax, Nova Scotia, Canada
|
|-
|Win
|
|align=left| Gilbert Mwambo
|KO
|8
|09/03/1986
|align=left| Lilongwe, Malawi
|align=left|
|-
|Win
|
|align=left|Ben Chitenje
|KO
|3
|09/02/1986
|align=left| Malawi
|
|-
|Win
|
|align=left| Joseph Poto
|KO
|5
|02/11/1985
|align=left| Malawi
|align=left|
|-
|Win
|
|align=left|Justice Mahilasi
|PTS
|6
|29/06/1985
|align=left| Malawi
|
|-
|Win
|
|align=left|Titus Kanyanji
|KO
|3
|24/02/1985
|align=left| Malawi
|
|-align=center
|Win
|
|align=left|Justice Mahilasi
|KO
|2
|28/12/1984
|align=left| Malawi
|
|}

References

External links
 
 Boxing-Records
 sports-reference

1964 births
Living people
People from Lilongwe
Malawian male boxers
Light-heavyweight boxers
Boxers at the 1984 Summer Olympics
Olympic boxers of Malawi